Below are lists of films produced in Hong Kong in the 1990s.

List of Hong Kong films of 1990
List of Hong Kong films of 1991
List of Hong Kong films of 1992
List of Hong Kong films of 1993
List of Hong Kong films of 1994
List of Hong Kong films of 1995
List of Hong Kong films of 1996
List of Hong Kong films of 1997
List of Hong Kong films of 1998
List of Hong Kong films of 1999

See also
List of films set in Hong Kong

Films
Hong Kong